The Fast and the Furious is a 2001 action film directed by Rob Cohen from a screenplay by Gary Scott Thompson, Erik Bergquist, and David Ayer, from a story by Thompson. The first installment in the Fast & Furious franchise, it stars Paul Walker, Vin Diesel, Michelle Rodriguez, and Jordana Brewster. In the film, Brian O'Conner (Walker), an LAPD police officer, goes undercover in the street racing world to investigate a string of truck carjackings.

The Fast and the Furious entered development in late 1998, after Cohen and producer Neal H. Moritz read a Vibe article about illegal street racing in New York City. Thompson and Bergquist wrote the original screenplay that year, with Ayer hired soon after. Various actors were considered for the roles of O'Conner and Toretto, with Walker cast in 1998 and then Diesel in early 1999, with the pair attending actual street races in preparation for the film. Principal photography began in July 2000 and finished that October, with filming locations primarily including Los Angeles and the surrounding area in southern California. Record producer BT was hired to compose the score. The film's title is borrowed from Roger Corman's 1954 film of the same name.

Originally for worldwide release in March 2001, The Fast and the Furious premiered at Mann Village Theatre in Los Angeles on June 18, 2001, and was theatrically released in the United States on June 22, by Universal Pictures. The film received mixed reviews from critics, with criticism for its story but praise for the action sequences and Walker and Diesel's performances, with the film considered their breakthrough roles. The Fast and the Furious grossed $207 million worldwide, making it the 19th highest-grossing film of 2001. It was followed by the sequel film 2 Fast 2 Furious (2003).

Plot 
On a deserted highway, a heist crew driving three modified Honda Civics assault a truck carrying electronic goods, steal its cargo, and escape into the night. A joint Los Angeles Police Department (LAPD) and FBI task force sends LAPD officer Brian O'Conner undercover to locate the crew. He begins his investigation at Toretto's Market and flirts with its owner Mia, sister of the infamous street racer Dominic Toretto, while Dominic sits in the back office reading a newspaper. Dominic's crew—Vince, Leon, Jesse, and Dom's girlfriend Letty—arrives. Vince, who has a crush on Mia, starts a fight with Brian until Dominic intervenes.

That night, Brian brings a modified 1995 Mitsubishi Eclipse to an illegal street race, hoping to find a lead on the thieves. Dominic arrives in his Mazda RX-7 and initiates a drag race between himself, Brian and two other drivers. Lacking credibility, Brian is forced to wager his car. Dominic wins the race after Brian's car malfunctions, but the LAPD arrive before Dom can take the vehicle. Brian helps Dominic escape in the Eclipse, but they accidentally venture into the territory of Dominic's old racing rival, gang leader Johnny Tran and his cousin Lance Nguyen, who destroy the Eclipse. After returning to safety, Dominic reiterates that Brian still owes him a "10 second car".

Brian brings a damaged 1994 Toyota Supra to Dominic's garage as a replacement. Dominic and his crew begin the long process of restoring the vehicle, and Brian starts dating Mia. He also begins investigating Tran, convinced that he is the mastermind behind the truck hijackings. While investigating one garage at night, Brian is discovered by Dominic and Vince. Brian convinces them that he is researching his opponents' vehicles for the upcoming desert Race Wars. Together, the trio investigate Tran's garage, discovering a large quantity of electronic goods.

Brian reports the discovery to his superiors and Tran and Lance are arrested. The electronics are proved to have been purchased legally, and Brian is forced to confront his suspicion that Dominic is the true mastermind. Brian is given 36 hours to find the heist crew, as the truckers are now arming themselves to defend against the hijackings. The following day, Dominic and Brian attend Race Wars. There, Jesse wagers his father's MK3 Volkswagen Jetta against Tran in his Honda S2000, but flees with the car after he loses. Tran demands Dominic recover the vehicle. He also accuses Dominic of reporting him to the police, causing Dominic to attack him, requiring security guards to break up the fight.

That night, Brian witnesses Dominic and his crew leaving and realizes they are the hijackers. He reveals his true identity to Mia and convinces her to help him find the crew. Dominic, Letty, Vince, and Leon attack a semi-trailer truck, intending it to be their final heist. The armed driver shoots Vince and runs Letty off the road. Brian arrives with Mia and rescues Vince. He is forced to reveal his identity to call in emergency medical care to save Vince. Dominic, Mia and the rest of the crew leave before the authorities can arrive.

Some time later, Brian arrives at Dominic's house to apprehend him as Dominic is getting his father's 1970 Dodge Charger R/T out of the garage. He demands Brian leave, since he is not running, but rather going to rescue Jesse who has no one else to look after him. Jesse suddenly arrives at the house and pleads for protection. Tran and Lance perform a drive-by shooting on motorcycles, killing Jesse. Brian and Dominic give chase in their separate vehicles, finding and killing Tran and injuring Lance. Brian then pursues Dominic, with them both eventually acquiescing to a quarter-mile drag race. The pair barely cross a railroad before a train passes, which ends the race in a draw, but Dominic crashes his car into a truck. Instead of arresting him, Brian gives Dominic the keys to his own car, asserting that he still owes him a 10-second car from their first race. Dominic leaves in the Supra as Brian walks away.

In the post-credits scene, Dominic is seen driving through Baja California, Mexico, in a 1970 Chevrolet Chevelle SS.

Cast 

 
 Paul Walker as Brian O'Conner:An LAPD police officer sent to infiltrate a crew of hijackers. Mia's love interest.
Vin Diesel as Dominic Toretto:Leader of the heist crew and a professional street racer. He was banned from professional racing after a violent retaliatory attack on the man who accidentally killed Dominic's father.
 Michelle Rodriguez as Letty Ortiz: A member of Dominic's crew and his girlfriend.
 Jordana Brewster as Mia Toretto: Dominic's sister and owner of the Toretto general store. Brian's love interest.
 Rick Yune as Johnny Tran: A Vietnamese gang leader and rival of Dominic.
 Chad Lindberg as Jesse: A member of Dominic's crew. Highly intelligent with math, algebra, and in computing, but he suffers from attention deficit disorder.
 Johnny Strong as Leon: A member of Dominic's crew.
 Matt Schulze as Vince: A member of Dominic's crew and his childhood friend. He harbors an unrequited love for Mia.

The central cast is rounded out by Ted Levine and Thom Barry as Tanner and Bilkins respectively, members of the team that organized the investigation to place Brian undercover. Noel Gugliemi appears as Hector, the organizer of the drag race. Musician and rapper Ja Rule and car tuner R.J. de Vera also act as Edwin and Danny, fellow drivers at the drag race who race against Dominic and Brian. Vyto Ruginis plays Harry, an informant and owner of The Racer's Edge. Reggie Lee portrays Lance Nguyen, Tran's cousin, and right-hand man. Neal H. Moritz and Rob Cohen both appear in cameos; Moritz plays an unnamed driver of a black Ferrari F355 convertible who is given a challenge by Brian, while Cohen plays a Pizza Hut delivery man.

Production

Development 
Director Rob Cohen was inspired to make the film after reading a 1998 Vibe magazine article called "Racer X" about street racing in New York City and watching an actual illegal street race at night in Los Angeles, with the screenplay originally developed by Gary Scott Thompson and Erik Bergquist.  The film's original title was Redline before it was changed to  The Fast and the Furious. Roger Corman licensed the title rights of his 1954 film The Fast and the Furious to Universal so that the title could be used on this project; both films were about racing. David Ayer was brought into the project to help rework the script. Ayer changed it from the "mostly white and suburban story" set in New York to a diverse one set in Los Angeles.

Producer Neal H. Moritz, who had previously worked with Paul Walker on the film The Skulls (2000), gave the actor a script and offered him the role of Brian O'Conner. Eminem was offered the role, but turned it down to work in his own movie 8 Mile and Mark Wahlberg and Christian Bale were also considered for the role. Originally, the studio told the producers they would green-light the film if they could get Timothy Olyphant to play the role of Dominic Toretto. Olyphant, however, who had starred in the previous year's car-themed blockbuster Gone in 60 Seconds, declined the role. Moritz instead suggested Vin Diesel, who had to be convinced to take the role even though he had only played supporting roles up to that point. The role of Mia Toretto was originally written for Eliza Dushku, who turned down the role and Sarah Michelle Gellar, Jessica Biel, Kirsten Dunst and Natalie Portman auditioned for the role.

Filming 
The film was shot in various locations within Los Angeles and parts of southern California, from June 26, to October 25, 2000. Key locations included Dodger Stadium (on the opening scene where Brian tests his Eclipse on the parking lot), Angelino Heights, Silver Lake and Echo Park (the neighborhoods around Toretto's home), as well as Little Saigon (where Tran destroys the Eclipse) and the San Bernardino International Airport (the venue for Race Wars, which attracted over 1,500 import car owners and enthusiasts). The entire last rig heist scene was filmed along Domenigoni Parkway on the southern side of San Jacinto/Hemet in the San Jacinto Valley near Diamond Valley Lake.

Prior to filming, both Jordana Brewster and Michelle Rodriguez did not have driver's licenses, so they took driving lessons during production. For the climactic race scene between Brian and Toretto, separate shots of both cars crossing the railroad and the train crossing the street were filmed, then composited together to give the illusion of the train narrowly missing the cars. A long steel rod was used as a ramp for Toretto's car to crash through the semi-truck and fly in mid-air.

An alternate ending titled "More than Furious" was filmed, in which Tanner drops Brian off at the Toretto home, where he encounters Mia packing, intending to move away. Brian reveals that he resigned from the LAPD, who let him go quietly, and that he wants another chance with her. When Mia tells him that it's not going to be that simple, Brian tells her that he's got time. This ending was released in the collection bundle DVD version.

During the filming of the movie, seventy-eight cars were wrecked both on and off-screen.  Out of the seventy-eight cars, three cars were shown being destroyed in the film's trailer alone.

Music 

The film's score was composed by music producer BT, mixing electronica with hip-hop and industrial influences. Two soundtracks were released for the film. The first one features mostly hip-hop and rap music. The second one, titled More Fast and Furious, features alternative metal, post-grunge and nu metal songs, as well as select tracks from BT's score.

Release

Box office 
The Fast and the Furious was released on June 22, 2001, in North America and ranked #1 at the box office ahead of Dr. Dolittle 2, Lara Croft: Tomb Raider and Atlantis: The Lost Empire, earning $40,089,015 during its opening weekend. The film became one of the four consecutive Universal films of 2001 to gross $40 million in their opening weekends, with the others being Jurassic Park III, American Pie 2 and The Mummy Returns. Its widest release was 2,889 theaters. During its run, the film has made a domestic total of $144,533,925 along with an international total of $62,750,000 bringing its worldwide total of $207,283,925 on a budget of $38 million.

Home media
The Fast and the Furious was released on DVD and VHS on January 2, 2002. The DVD release sold 2.1 million copies during its first day of release, making it the second-highest single-day DVD sales of any film, behind Pearl Harbor. The film also made $18.6 million in DVD rentals, which was the highest at the time, beating Cast Away. It would hold this record for four months until it was surpassed by Harry Potter and the Sorcerer's Stone that May. More than 5.5 million home video units were sold by April 2002. A second DVD, dubbed the "Tricked Out Edition", was released on June 3, 2003, and features The Turbo Charged Prelude for 2 Fast 2 Furious, a short film that set the tone of the film's sequel. An abridged version of the short film is also on the sequel's DVD release.

Merchandising 
Racing Champions released diecast metal replicas of the film's cars in different scales from 1/18 to 1/64. RadioShack sold ZipZaps micro RC versions of the cars in 2002. 1/24 scale plastic model kits of the hero cars were manufactured by AMT Ertl.

Reception

Critical response 
On Rotten Tomatoes, The Fast and the Furious has an approval rating of 54% based on 154 reviews, and an average rating of 5.40/10. The website's critical consensus reads: "Sleek and shiny on the surface, The Fast and the Furious recalls those cheesy teenage exploitation flicks of the 1950s." On Metacritic, the film has a weighted average score of 58 out of 100 based on 29 critics, indicating "mixed or average reviews". Audiences surveyed by CinemaScore gave the film an average grade of "B+" on an A+ to F scale.

Todd McCarthy of Variety called the film "a gritty and gratifying cheap thrill, Rob Cohen's high-octane hot-car meller is a true rarity these days, a really good exploitationer, the sort of thing that would rule at drive-ins if they still existed." Kevin Thomas of the Los Angeles Times called it "an action picture that's surprising in the complexity of its key characters and portents of tragedy." Vin Diesel's portrayal of Dominic Torretto won praise, with Reece Pendleton of the Chicago Reader writing that "Diesel carries the movie with his unsettling mix of Zen-like tranquillity and barely controlled rage." Future franchise director Louis Leterrier and star Jason Statham went to watch the film in Paris in 2001 while on a break from filming The Transporter (2002), and praised it.

Other reviews were more mixed. Susan Wloszczyna of USA Today gave the film 2 out of 4 stars, saying that Cohen "at least knows how to keep matters moving and the action sequences exciting." Owen Gleiberman of Entertainment Weekly gave the film a C, saying it "works hard to be exciting, but the movie scarcely lives up to its title." Rita Kempley of The Washington Post gave the film a scathing review, calling it "Rebel Without a Cause without a cause. The Young and the Restless with gas fumes. The Quick and the Dead with skid marks." Paul Clinton of CNN wrote that Cohen "created a high-octane, rubber-burning extravaganza" but he criticized the film for "plot holes you could drive the proverbial truck through" and an "idiotic" ending.

Accolades

References

External links 

 
 
 The Fast and the Furious at Netflix

2001 films
2001 action thriller films
2000s chase films
2001 crime thriller films
2000s heist films
American action thriller films
American chase films
American crime thriller films
American heist films
2000s English-language films
Films about the Los Angeles Police Department
Films based on newspaper and magazine articles
Films directed by Rob Cohen
Films produced by Neal H. Moritz
Films scored by BT (musician)
Films set in Los Angeles
Films set in Mexico
Films shot in Los Angeles
German action thriller films
German crime thriller films
English-language German films
Films with screenplays by David Ayer
Films with screenplays by Gary Scott Thompson
Fast & Furious films
Universal Pictures films
Original Film films
2000s American films
2000s German films